The Wairau by-election 1872 was a by-election held in the  electorate during the 5th New Zealand Parliament, on 19 February 1872. The by-election was caused by the resignation of incumbent MP William Henry Eyes and was won by Arthur Seymour, who defeated Joseph Ward. Both candidates were prominent Marlborough politicians, and for both of them, this was their first attempt at election to the General Assembly.

Background

Incumbent
William Henry Eyes became a member of the Marlborough Provincial Council in 1860, and in the 1861 general election, he became a member of the General Assembly for the  electorate by defeating the incumbent, the later premier Frederick Weld. Eyes was Superintendent of Marlborough Province from 1865 to 1870, but some of his actions as Superintendent made him a controversial figure. In , Eyes was challenged by Henry Redwood but remained the preferred representative by the voters. In December 1871, Eyes was appointed Crown Lands Commissioner for the Marlborough Province and as a public servant, he could no longer hold a seat in parliament or the provincial council and had to resign. This resignation triggered the parliamentary by-election.

Arthur Seymour
Arthur Seymour was another prominent politician in the Marlborough Province, and a strong rival of Eyes. Seymour was a member of the Marlborough Provincial Council almost continuously during its existence from 1860 to 1876. He was the leader of the Picton Party that managed to have the provincial buildings for Marlborough built in Picton instead of Blenheim. Seymour was Superintendent of Marlborough in 1864 and 1865, and when he was succeeded by Eyes, the capital seat was moved to Blenheim. The reason for Seymour's 1865 resignation was his appointment to the Legislative Council. Seymour in turn resigned from the Legislative Council in 1872 so that he could contest the Wairau by-election. In 1870, Seymour had commenced his second period as Superintendent for Marlborough Province.

Joseph Ward
Joseph Ward was a surveyor by trade, and he became a significant runholder who at one point had 50,000 sheep. He joined provincial politics in 1853 when the provinces were set up. For the first five years, he represented the Wairau electorate in the Nelson Provincial Council. The Marlborough Province split off from Nelson, Ward was elected onto the Marlborough Provincial Council and had continuous representation until the abolition of the provincial system in 1876. Like Seymour, standing in the Wairau by-election was Ward's first attempt of getting elected to the general assembly.

Nomination
The nomination meeting was held at Blenheim on Wednesday, 14 February. The show of hands resulted in 27 votes for Seymour, and 14 for Ward. The supporters of Ward demanded a poll, and the date for this was set as Monday, 19 February.

Results
Four polling booths were provided in the Wairau electorate, and 283 votes were cast. Both candidates won two of the booths, but they had significantly different voter bases. Seymour won the election with a majority of 39 votes.

The results by polling booth were as follows:

Seymour remained a member of the General Assembly until his resignation in 1875 prior to a trip to England. The resulting  was won by Ward, who defeated William Sefton Moorhouse.

Notes

References

Wairau 1872
1872 elections in New Zealand
Politics of the Marlborough Region